Yu-Gi-Oh! Capsule Monsters is a 12-episode mini-series commissioned and produced by 4Kids Entertainment in the United States, and animated by Studio Gallop in Japan. The miniseries was produced exclusively for international broadcast, making it the only anime series in the Yu-Gi-Oh! franchise to not see a release in Japan. A short-lived board game, Yu-Gi-Oh! Capsule Monsters Collectible Figure Game, was created based on this mini-series. It is best to watch after episode 198 of Duel Monsters as it takes place between episodes 198 and 199.

Episode list

Notes

References
 Capsule monsters episode guide

2006 American television seasons
Capsule Monsters